Ludwig van Beethoven's Concerto for Violin, Cello, and Piano in C major, Op. 56, commonly known as the Triple Concerto, was composed in 1803 and published in 1804 by Breitkopf & Härtel. The choice of the three solo instruments effectively makes this a concerto for piano trio, and it is the only concerto Beethoven ever completed for more than one solo instrument. A typical performance takes approximately thirty-seven minutes.

History 
Beethoven's early biographer Anton Schindler claimed that the Triple Concerto was written for Beethoven's royal pupil, the Archduke Rudolf of Austria. The Archduke, who became an accomplished pianist and composer under Beethoven's tutelage, was only in his mid-teens at this time, and it seems plausible that Beethoven's strategy was to create a showy but relatively easy piano part that would be backed up by two more mature and skilled soloists. However, there is no record of Rudolf ever performing the work, and a number of Beethoven scholars have questioned Schindler's claim.

The Triple Concerto was publicly premiered in 1808, at the summer Augarten concerts in Vienna. The violinist in the premiere was Carl August Seidler, and the cellist was Nikolaus Kraft, who was known for "technical mastery" and a "clear, rich tone". The concerto was Beethoven's first work to use advanced cello techniques.

In the published version, the concerto bore a dedication to a different patron: Prince Lobkowitz.

Movements 
The concerto is divided into three movements:

 Allegro
 Largo (attacca)
 Rondo alla (polacca)

The first movement is broadly scaled and cast in a moderate march tempo, and includes decorative solo passage-work and leisurely repetitions, variations, and extensions of assorted themes. A common feature is a dotted rhythm (short-long, short-long) that lends an air of graciousness and pomp that is not exactly "heroic," but would have conveyed a character of fashionable dignity to contemporary listeners—and perhaps a hint of the noble "chivalric" manner that was becoming a popular element of novels, plays, operas, and pictures. The jogging triplets that figure in much of the accompaniment also contribute to this effect. In this movement, as in the other two, the cello enters solo with the first subject. Unusual for a concerto of this scale, the first movement begins quietly, with a gradual crescendo into the exposition, with the main theme later introduced by the soloists. Also unusually, the exposition modulates to A minor instead of the expected G major. (Beethoven's friend Ferdinand Ries later did the same mediant transition in his sixth concerto.) This movement takes sixteen to nineteen minutes.

The slow movement, in A-flat major, is a large-scale introduction to the finale, which follows it without pause. The cello and violin share the melodic material of the movement between them while the piano provides a discreet accompaniment. This movement takes about five to six minutes.

There is no break between the second and third movements. Dramatic repeated notes launch into the third movement, a polonaise (also called "polacca"), an emblem of aristocratic fashion during the Napoleonic era, which is, thus, in keeping with the character of "polite entertainment" that characterizes this concerto as a whole. The bolero-like rhythm, also characteristic of the polonaise, can be heard in the central minor theme of the final movement. This movement takes about thirteen to fourteen minutes.

In addition to the violin, cello, and piano soloists, the concerto is scored for one flute, two oboes, two clarinets, two bassoons, two horns, two trumpets, timpani, and strings. The flute, oboes, trumpets, and timpani are tacet during the second movement.

Recordings 
Popular recordings of the Triple Concerto include the following:
 John Corigliano Sr., Leonard Rose, and Walter Hendl, under Bruno Walter, New York Philharmonic Orchestra, 1949
 David Oistrakh, Sviatoslav Knushevitsky, and Lev Oborin, under Sir Malcolm Sargent, Philharmonia Orchestra, 1958
 Jaime Laredo, Leslie Parnas, and Rudolf Serkin, under Alexander Schneider, Marlboro Festival Orchestra, 1962
 Yehudi Menuhin, Maurice Gendron, and Hephzibah Menuhin, under István Kertész, London Symphony Orchestra, 1964
 Isaac Stern, Leonard Rose, and Eugene Istomin, under Eugene Ormandy, Philadelphia Orchestra, 1964
 David Oistrakh, Mstislav Rostropovich, and Sviatoslav Richter, under Herbert von Karajan, Berlin Philharmonic, 1969
 Suk Trio, under Kurt Masur, Czech Philharmonic, 1974
 Anne-Sophie Mutter, Yo-Yo Ma, and Mark Zeltser, under Herbert von Karajan, Berlin Philharmonic, 1979
Trio Zingara, under Edward Heath, English Chamber Orchestra, 1988
 Itzhak Perlman, Yo-Yo Ma, and Daniel Barenboim, under Daniel Barenboim, Berlin Philharmonic, 1995
 Dong-Suk Kang, Maria Kliegel, and Jenő Jandó, under Béla Drahos, Nicolaus Esterházy Sinfonia, 1997
 Renaud Capuçon, Mischa Maisky, and Martha Argerich, under Alexandre Rabinovitch, Orchestra della Svizzera Italiana, 2003
 Thomas Zehetmair, Clemens Hagen, and Pierre-Laurent Aimard, under Nikolaus Harnoncourt, Chamber Orchestra of Europe, 2004
 Gordan Nikolitch, Tim Hugh, and Lars Vogt, under Bernard Haitink, London Symphony Orchestra, 2005
 Ilya Gringolts, Mario Brunello, and Alexander Lonquich, under Claudio Abbado, Simón Bolívar Youth Orchestra of Venezuela, 2006
 Anne-Sophie Mutter, Yo-Yo Ma, and Daniel Barenboim, West-Eastern Divan Orchestra, 2019
 Isabelle Faust, Jean-Guihen Queyras and Alexander Melnikov, under Pablo Heras-Casado, Freiburger Barockorchester, 2021

References

External links 

 

Concertos by Ludwig van Beethoven
1803 compositions
Compositions in C major
Beethoven
Music dedicated to benefactors or patrons